Joshua Mathiot (April 4, 1800 – July 30, 1849) was a U.S. Representative from Ohio.

Born in Connellsville, Pennsylvania, Mathiot moved to Newark, Ohio, about 1830.
He studied law.
He was admitted to the bar and practiced in Newark.
He served as prosecuting attorney 1832–1836.
He served as mayor of Newark in 1834.

Mathiot was elected as a Whig to the Twenty-seventh Congress (March 4, 1841 – March 3, 1843).
Grand worthy patriarch of the Sons of Temperance in Ohio, and while attending a temperance convention at Sandusky contracted cholera, from which he died in Newark, Ohio, July 30, 1849.
He was interred in Cedar Hill Cemetery.

Sources

1800 births
1849 deaths
People from Fayette County, Pennsylvania
Politicians from Newark, Ohio
Burials at Cedar Hill Cemetery, Newark, Ohio
Mayors of places in Ohio
County district attorneys in Ohio
Whig Party members of the United States House of Representatives from Ohio
19th-century American politicians